The PowerBook G4 is a series of notebook computers manufactured, marketed, and sold by Apple Computer between 2001 and 2006 as part of its PowerBook line of notebooks. The PowerBook G4 runs on the RISC-based PowerPC G4 processor, designed by the AIM (Apple/IBM/Motorola) development alliance and initially produced by Motorola. It was built later by Freescale, after Motorola spun off its semiconductor business under that name in 2004. The PowerBook G4 has two different designs: one enclosed in a titanium body with a translucent black keyboard and a 15-inch screen; and another in an aluminum body with an aluminum-colored keyboard, in 12-inch, 15-inch, and 17-inch sizes.

Between 2001 and 2003, Apple produced the titanium PowerBook G4; between 2003 and 2006, the aluminum models were produced. Both models were hailed for their modern design, long battery life, and processing power. When the aluminum PowerBook G4s were first released in January 2003, 12-inch and 17-inch models were introduced first, while the 15-inch model retained the titanium body until September 2003, when a new aluminum 15-inch PowerBook was released. The aluminum 15-inch model also includes a FireWire 800 port, which had been included with the 17-inch model since its debut nine months earlier.

The PowerBook G4 is the last generation of the PowerBook series, and was succeeded by the Intel-powered MacBook Pro line in the first half of 2006. The latest version of OS X that any PowerBook G4 can run is Mac OS X Leopard, released in 2007. When Apple switched to Intel x86 processors in 2006, the PowerBook G4's form and aluminum chassis were retained for the MacBook Pro.

1st generation: Titanium

The first generation of the PowerBook G4 was announced at Steve Jobs' MacWorld Expo keynote on January 9, 2001. The two models featured a PowerPC G4 processor running at either 400 or 500 MHz, housed in a titanium-clad case that was 1 inch (25 mm) deep. This was 0.7 inches (18 mm) shallower than the G4's predecessor, the PowerBook G3. The G4 was among the first laptops to use a screen with a widescreen aspect ratio. It also featured a front-mounted slot-loading optical drive. The notebook was given the unofficial nickname "TiBook", after the titanium case and the PowerBook brand name; it was sold alongside the cheaper iBook. The 1 GHz version of the titanium G4 is the last, and fastest, PowerBook that can natively run Mac OS 9 (version 9.2.2).

Industrial design
The initial design of the PowerBook G4 was developed by Apple hardware designers Jory Bell, Nick Merz, and Danny Delulis. Quanta, an original design manufacturer, also helped in the design. The new machine was a sharp departure from the black plastic, curvilinear PowerBook G3 models that preceded it. The orientation of the Apple logo on the computer's lid was switched so that it would "read" correctly to onlookers when the computer was in use. PowerBook G3 and prior models presented it right-side-up from the perspective of the computer's owner when the lid was closed. Apple's industrial design team, headed by British designer Jonathan Ive, converged around a minimalist aesthetic—the titanium G4's design language laid the groundwork for the aluminum PowerBook G4, the MacBook Pro, the Power Mac G5, the flat-screen iMac, the Xserve, and the Mac mini.

Quality issues
The hinges on the titanium PowerBook display are notorious for breaking under typical use. Usually the hinge (which is shaped like an L) will break just to the left of where it attaches to the lower case on the right hinge, and just to the right on the left hinge (where the right hinge is on the right side of the computer when the optical drive is facing the user). When the 667 MHz and 800 MHz "DVI" PowerBooks were introduced, Apple changed the hinge design slightly to strengthen it. At least one aftermarket manufacturer began producing sturdier replacement hinges to address this problem, though actually performing the repair is difficult as the display bezel is glued together. In addition some discolouration, bubbling or peeling of paint on the outer bezel occurred, notably around the area where the palm would rest while using the trackpad, and around the rear of the hinges where paint on the back of the machine was often worn off. This appeared on early models but not on later titanium PowerBooks.

Display issues
The video cable is routed around the left-side hinge. This will cause the cable to weaken under heavy usage. Many owners have reported display problems such as random lines or a jumbled screen, although a few owners have replaced just the video cable to successfully resolve this problem. There is also a backlight cable that might fail; The best option is to replace either or both cables before replacing LCD screen.

Technical specifications
All are obsolete.

2nd generation: Aluminum

In 2003, Apple introduced a new line of PowerBook G4s with 12-, 15-, and 17-inch screens and aluminum cases. The new notebooks not only brought a different design to the PowerBook G4 line but also laid down the foundation for Apple’s notebook design for the next five years, replaced initially in January 2008 by the MacBook Air and the subsequent MacBook and MacBook Pro redesigns in October. The 15" titanium model was still available until September 16, 2003, when the aluminum model replaced it. Notably, the 12" model brought a welcome return to the Apple subnotebook configuration, conspicuously lacking in their product line since the discontinuation of the PowerBook 2400 in 1998. While the titanium PowerBook G4s were capable of booting into Mac OS 9 or Mac OS X operating systems, the aluminum PowerBook G4s could only boot into Mac OS X. Both series of machines could run Mac OS 9 in Classic mode from within Mac OS X.

Industrial design
The aluminum PowerBook G4 was designed by Apple's Vice President of Industrial Design, Jonathan Ive, and used a radically different design from the preceding titanium models. The most obvious change was the use of aluminum instead of titanium to manufacture the body. The keyboard, which was originally black, was changed to match the color of the body. Additionally, the aluminum keyboard was backlit on the 17" model and on one of the 15" models. This was the first case of keyboard internal backlighting seen on a notebook computer. The design was considered superior to most other notebooks when it debuted in 2003, and consequently, it made the PowerBook G4 one of the most desirable notebooks on the market. The external design of Apple's professional laptops continued to remain similar to the aluminum PowerBook G4 until the Spotlight on Notebooks event on October 14, 2008.

Quality issues
Some owners have experienced failure of the lower memory slot on some of the 15" models, with the typical repair being the replacement of the logic board. Apple had started a Repair Extension Program concerning the issue, but it has been noted that some models displaying the issue have not been included. This leaves certain PowerBook G4 owners with only a maximum of 1 GB of RAM to use instead of a full 2 GB.

Apple previously had a Repair Extension Program to fix the "white spot" issue on its 15" PowerBook displays.

There has also been a rash of reports concerning sudden and pervasive sleeping of 1.5 and 1.67 GHz models known as Narcoleptic Aluminum PowerBook Syndrome. Symptoms include the PowerBook suddenly entering sleep mode, regardless of the battery level or whether the PowerBook is plugged in. One cause is the ambient light sensing, and associated instruction set coding, with possible keyboard backlight and sleep light issues accompanying the so-called "narcolepsy". Another cause is the trackpad area heat sensor; system logs report "Power Management received emergency overtemp signal. Going to sleep.".

To correct this, service groups will often replace the logic board or power converter, but the actual fix (depending on the model) for the first cause is to replace or remove the left or right ambient light sensors; and for the second cause, disconnect, remove, or replace the heat sensor, or the entire top case which holds the trackpad heat sensor. Alternatively, there are reports which detail success in removing certain sensor kernel extensions or rebuilding the kernel using the Darwin Open Source project after commenting out the relevant sleepSystem() call; permanent resolution of the sleep issue in this manner is little documented.

The 1.67 GHz model may suffer from manufacturing or design defects in its display. Initial reports pointed to this only being a problem with type M9689 17" PowerBooks introduced in Q2 2005, but then this problem was also seen in displays replaced by Apple Service Providers in this period (e.g. because of the bright spots issue). The devices were the last 17" models shipped with the matte 1440×900 pixel low-resolution display. After many months of usage, the displays may show permanently shining lines of various colors stretching vertically across the LCD. Often this will start with one-pixel-wide vertical lines being "stuck" in an "always-on" mode. Various sites have been set up documenting this issue.

On May 20, 2005, Apple recalled 12-inch iBook G4, and 12- and 15-inch PowerBook G4 batteries (model number A1061, first 5 characters HQ441 – HQ507 for the iBook, model # A1079, serial # 3X446 – 3X510 for 12" PowerBook, model # A1078, serial # 3X446 – 3X509.) They were recalled due to short-circuiting which caused overheating and explosion. The batteries were made by LG Chemical, in Taiwan and China. Apple has since removed the recall from its website.

Technical specifications 
All are obsolete.

Discontinuation
One major factor that led to the discontinuation of the PowerBook G4 was Apple's internal experimentation with the PowerPC G5 for the company's next line professional-grade notebooks at that time. However, the G5, which powered Apple Power Mac G5 and iMac G5 computers proved to be too power-hungry and heat-intensive to use in a notebook form factor. Stalled development of the mobile G5 is also said to be another main factor in the Mac's transition from PowerPC to Intel processors.

After awaiting a new professional-grade notebook to replace the G4, on January 10, 2006, Apple released the 15" MacBook Pro, its first Intel-based notebook. A 17" version of the MacBook Pro followed on April 24, 2006. The new "MacBook Pro" name was given to the new series of notebooks after Apple changed the portable naming schemes from "Power" for professional products (and "i" for consumer products), in favor of including "Mac" in the title of all computer lines, with the suffix "Pro" denoting a pro product. Finally, on May 16, 2006, the 12" PowerBook G4 and the G4 iBook were discontinued and replaced by the 13.3" MacBook, ending the whole PowerBook line.

However, a replacement for the 12" subnotebook form factor (i.e. the 12" PowerBook G4) was not immediately forthcoming; the MacBook Air, released in 2008, served as an indirect replacement while the 13" MacBook Pro released in 2009 is the direct replacement for the 12" PowerBook G4. Apple returned to the 12" screen size with the MacBook released in 2015.

Supported Mac OS releases

Timeline

Notes

References

General

External links

Apple - Support - PowerBook G4
Video of Jobs launching PowerBook G4 Titanium at Macworld 2001
Video of Jobs launching PowerBook G4 Aluminum at Macworld 2003
PowerBook G4, EveryMac.com
Alu G4 Disassembly

G4
PowerPC Macintosh computers
Computer-related introductions in 2000